Ibn Abd al-Zahir (1223–1293) was an Egyptian chancery scribe, poet and historian during the Mamluk period. Several of his works survive, including three biographies of the early Mamluk sultans Baibars, Al-Mansur Qalawun and Al-Ashraf Khalil. In addition, a diwan of his poetry survives, as does a collection of letters written by Saladin's vizier al-Qāḍī al-Fāḍil which he compiled, and parts of a geographical work entitled Kitāb al-Rawḍah al-Bahīyah which was used extensively by the later historian Al-Maqrizi for his work "Al-Mawāʿiẓ wa-l-iʾtibār bi-dhikr al-khiṭaṭ wa al-athār." His son Fath al-Din Ibn Abd al-Zahir and grandson Ala al-Din Ibn Abd al-Zahir were also important chancery scribes of the Mamluk period, as was his nephew Shafiʾ ibn ʾAli who also wrote three surviving biographies of sultans Baibars, Qalawun and An-Nasir Muhammad.

Writings
al-Rawḍ al-zāhir fī sīrat al-Malik al-Ẓāhir (ed. ʿAbd al-ʿAzīz al-Khuwayṭir, Riyadh, 1976; partial English translation in Baybars I of Egypt, ed. Syedah Fatima Sadequi, London, 1958))
Tashrīf al-ayyām wa-l-ʿuṣūr bi-sīrat al-Malik al-Manṣūr (ed. Murad Kāmil, Cairo, 1961)
al-Alṭāf al-khafiyya min al-sīra al-sharīfa al-sulṭāniyya al-Malikiyya al-Ashrafiyya, published in Ur ʿAbd Allah B. ʿAbd eẓ-Ẓâhir’s biografi over sultanen el-malik al-Aśraf Halîl (ed. Axel Moberg, Lund, 1902)
Al-Durr an-naẓīm min tarassul ʿAbd al-Raḥīm (ed. Aḥmad Aḥmad Badawī, Cairo, 1959)
al-Rawḍa l-bahiyya al-zāhira fī khiṭaṭ al-Muʿizziyya l-Qāhira"" (ed. Ayman Fuʾād Sayyid, Cairo, 1996).Dīwān: Dirāsa wa-taḥqīq'' (ed. Gharīb Muḥammad ʿAlī Aḥmad, Cairo, 1990)

References
Bauden, F., "Ibn ʾAbd al-Ẓāhir" Encyclopaedia of Islam III (2017)
Pedersen, J., "Ibn ʿAbd al-Ẓāhir"  Encyclopaedia of Islam II (1972), 679–680. 
Amitai, Reuven, "Ibn ʿAbd al-Ẓāhir, Muḥyī al-Dīn (1223-1292)."  A Global Encyclopedia of Historical Writing. ed. Woolf, D. R., New York and London: Garland Publishing, (1998) 435f.
Richards, D. S., "Ibn ʿAbd al-Ẓāhir (620-92/1223-92)."  Encyclopedia of Arabic Literature,   Routledge (1998), p. 303.
Strauẞ, E., "Muḥyîʾddîn b. ʿAbdaẓẓâhir." Wiener Zeitschrift für die Kunde des Morgenlandes 45, (1938), 191-202.

External links
Manuscript of Ibn Abd al-Zahir's biography of Qalawun
Manuscript of Ibn Abd al-Zahir's biography of al-Ashraf Khalil

1223 births
1293 deaths
13th-century Egyptian people
Egyptian historians of Islam